Harold Stratton could refer to:

Harold M. Stratton (1879-1962), American engineer and businessman
Harold "Tuffy" Stratton (1920-1994), American college football coach
Hal Stratton (born 1950), American attorney and former chairman of the U.S. Consumer Product Safety Commission